Wira Wira (Quechua for Gnaphalium viravira, Hispanicized spelling Huira Huira) is  mountain in the north of the Cordillera Blanca in the Andes of Peru. It is located in the Ancash Region, Huaylas Province, Yuracmarca District, and in the Pomabamba Province, Pomabamba District. It lies northeast of Pukahirka.

References

Mountains of Peru
Mountains of Ancash Region